Beckjord is a surname of Scandinavian origins (mostly found in Norway). Notable people with the surname include:

Jon-Erik Beckjord (1939–2008), American proponent of paranormal beliefs
Suprabha Beckjord (born 1956), American ultramarathon runner

Surnames of Scandinavian origin